is a train station in Nishikyō-ku, Kyoto, Kyoto Prefecture, Japan.

Lines
Hankyu Railway
Arashiyama Line

Layout
The station has two platforms serving two tracks.

Usage
In fiscal 2015, about 3,282,000 passengers used this station annually.

Adjacent stations

References

Railway stations in Kyoto